12B is a 2001 Indian Tamil-language romance film directed and written by cinematographer Jeeva; it is his directorial debut. The film stars  Shaam in his debut with Simran and Jyothika in lead roles. Hindi actors Suniel Shetty and Moonmoon Sen play supporting roles, and the music was composed by Harris Jayaraj. The film was released on 28 September 2001 to above-average reviews. Critics praised the new concept but criticised the narrative, which they found confusing.

The plot of 12B is loosely based on the 1998 British-American romantic drama film Sliding Doors. The film introduced the use of dual narrative to Tamil cinema; it depicts events in a man's life that depend on whether he catches a bus. The film gained attention for its casting of Simran and Jyothika, who were two of the leading female actors of Tamil cinema; it is also the first Tamil film in which Shetty and Sen appear.

Plot 
One morning, Shakti leaves his house for a job interview when he sees a woman, Jho, walking down the street. Shakti is distracted by Jho and begins to follow her. He misses his bus and gets mugged. The film then pauses as a voice-over tells the audience they are about to examine the impact of missing the bus on Shakti's life.

Shakti who catches the bus arrives on time for the job interview and is offered the job of a bank manager, and a beautiful young colleague Priya falls in love with him. Shakti, however, is still in love with Jho but something repeatedly prevents him from meeting her. The obstacle turns out to be his alternate self (the mechanic). Shakti the bank manager is well-off in life but is miserable because he cannot win the affections of Jo.

The Shakti who missed the bus arrives late at the interview and is thrown out. On his way home, he passes by a junkyard, where he meets his friend Madhan, who gives him a job as a mechanic. The next day, while crossing the street, he sees Jho and again follows her. He gains her attention and they begin a relationship. One day, Jo's uncle Rao Arvind visits, and it is revealed he too is in love with Jho and wants to marry her, much to Jo's dismay.

Due to a misunderstanding, Jho and Shakti the mechanic separate. Priya expresses her love for the Shakti the bank manager who, while reciprocating his love for Priya, has an accident. At the same moment, Shakti the mechanic is also seriously hurt in the same accident while he tries to repair his relationship with Jo. Both Shaktis are admitted to the hospital. While Priya is crying over the death of Shakti the bank manager, she glimpses Shakti the mechanic making up with Jo. The film ends with a voice-over concluding the film.

Cast 

 Shaam as Shakthivel
 Simran as Priya 
 Jyothika as Jho
 Sunil Shetty as Arvind
 Vivek as Mathan
 Moonmoon Sen as Sulo
 Shanti Williams as Shakti's mother
 R. Sundaramoorthy as Shakti's boss
 Mayilsamy as Mathan's friend
 Master Udayaraj as Mathan's friend
 Srinath as Mathan's friend
 Lakshmikanthan as Mathan's friend
 K. P. Mohan as Shakti's co-worker
 Vaishnavi as Shakti's sister
 M.R.K. as Shakti's uncle
 Crane Manohar as the 12B bus conductor
 Scissor Manohar as the auto driver
 Vengaiya Balan as a devotee
 Gowthami Vembunathan as Shakti's aunt
 Monica as Priya's co-worker
 Karnaa Radha as a devotee
 Citizen Mani as a devotee
 Shiva as Shakti's co-worker
 Manish Borundia (uncredited) as Shakti's co-worker
Sridhar  (uncredited) as a dancer in "Sariya Thavara" song
Dinesh  (uncredited) as a dancer in "Sariya Thavara" song
Jeeva  (uncredited) as the narrator at the end of the film

Parthiban provided the voice-over at the beginning of the film.

Production

Development 

12B marked the directorial debut of cinematographer Jeeva and is narrated in a dual narrative format, one if Shakthi (the main hero) catches the 12B bus to his job interview and one if he misses the same bus. Jeeva said the film would be titled 12B after a bus he used to take during his college days. The basic premise of the film was taken from the 1998 English film Sliding Doors by Peter Howitt, which also follows the lead character's alternate timelines. Film producer Vikram Singh opted to make his first foray into Tamil film production after being encouraged to by director Priyadarshan.

Casting 
Madhavan was initially considered for the lead role, but the actor was busy with other projects. Newcomer Srikanth also auditioned for the role, but fellow rookie actor Shaam was selected to play the lead role. Shaam had worked as a model in Bangalore for four years before model coordinator Biju Jayadevan introduced him to director Jeeva, who was auditioning a debutant actor for his debut venture, 12B. Shaam had unsuccessfully auditioned for the lead role in Kadhalar Dhinam (1999); he said during his first meeting with Jeeva, he handed over his portfolio and introduced himself in English. Jeeva said: "Repeat what you just said, in Tamil". Shaam did so and was signed on next day after a meeting with producer Vikram Singh. Since Shaam was looking for film offers for four years, Jeeva did not treat Shaam as a newcomer.

Simran and Jyothika, two of the leading Tamil female actors at the time, were cast in the other lead roles; Jyothika got more screen time. Simran called her role a "special appearance". Thota Tharani worked as the art director for the film. The promos of the film were critically praised; Shaam signed on to appear in several projects before 12B was released. The film also featured Jeeva's assistant director, Srinath, in a supporting role. After the first filming schedule, another actor tried to fill the lead role but Jeeva insisted on retaining Shaam. Parthiban provided a voiceover for the film.

A leading Hindi actor was revealed to play a cameo in the film. The actor was later revealed to be Sunil Shetty, who was cast to play Jyothika's uncle. Bengali actor Moon Moon Sen, mother of Riya Sen, was signed on to play Jyothika's mother in the film. In 12B, Shaam's voice was dubbed; an uncommon practice for male actors in Tamil cinema at that time. The appearance of Sunil Shetty in a prominent role led the filmmakers to release it in Hindi. Shiva, who later starred in Chennai 600028 (2007), made his acting debut with this film in a minor role. Chennai-based model Manish Borundia played a background actor in the film.

Themes and influences
12B introduced the concept of dual narrative to Tamil cinema, which was later used in the Tamil film Oh My Kadavule (2020).

Soundtrack 
The soundtrack of 12B was composed by Harris Jayaraj. The soundtrack became popular particularly the song "Oru Punnagai Poove".  Premgi Amaran crooned the rap song "Anandam".

Release 
12B received pre-release publicity because it brought together Simran and Jyothika, two of the Tamil film industry's leading actresses of the period. It performed modestly at the box office with average collections reported. Producer Vikram Singh revealed that he lost money producing the film although he felt it was worth it due to the film's unique script. Jeeva later stating he felt the film had not been properly promoted and could have done better business if it had been.

Reception 
A critic from The Hindu said the film is like "moving through a maze, because for many it could be confusion confounded, at least for the most part of the first half". The critic added; "Shyam in the hero's garb is an apt choice and looks more like a Madhavan clone and for a newcomer, Shyam is absolutely at ease in dance and fights" and "Simran does a commendable job in the climax". New Straits Times wrote; "The presence of Jyotika, Simran and Shyam saves this movie from boredom". Rediff concluded its review; "full marks to the intention – considerably less for the execution", praised the film's performances and technical aspects and said a "drawback would be the languid pace—there is not enough tension built into the film and, for large chunks of time, the story remains static, with the result that you do not empathise with the characters". The reviewer said Simran's portrayal "continues with her policy of shifting gradually from glam roles to the more sedate, serious ones and proves to have what it takes".

Sify wrote; "Ultimately it is very difficult for the audience to understand this superficial tale, as they cannot follow the thin line between reality and imagination. It is total confusion". The reviewer praised the Jayaraj's music for the film. Malini Mannath of Chennai Online opined that "But Jeeva steers his script deftly, and offers a film that is different, giving enough food for thought and room for discussion even after the film is over". Visual Dasan of Kalki criticised the film's story (which he felt was similar to the Hollywood film Sliding Doors and the German film Run Lola Run), called both roles of Shaam confusing and felt bad for Simran taking up such a role. He praised Vivek's comedy, Harris Jayaraj songs and the director for trying to take up a unique subject for his debut film.

Legacy 
The film helped establish Shaam as a chocolate boy; he acquired a fan following after the film's release.

References

Notes

External links 
 

2000s Tamil-language films
2001 directorial debut films
2001 films
2001 romantic drama films
Films directed by Jeeva
Films set in Chennai
Films shot in Chennai
Indian nonlinear narrative films
Indian romantic drama films
Films scored by Harris Jayaraj
Films shot in Jordan